Gnoriste is a genus of fungus gnats in the family Mycetophilidae. There are about 13 described species in Gnoriste.

Species
These 13 species belong to the genus Gnoriste:

G. apicalis Meigen, 1818
G. bilineata Zetterstedt, 1852
G. cornuta Zaitzev, 1994
G. groenlandica Lundbeck, 1898
G. harcyniae von Roder, 1887
G. longirostris Siebke, 1864
G. macra Johannsen, 1912
G. macroides Curran, 1927
G. megarrhina Osten Sacken, 1877
G. mikado Okada, 1939
G. mongolica Plassmann & Joost, 1990
†G. dentoni Scudder, 1877
†M. meigeniana (Heer, 1856)

References

Further reading

 

Mycetophilidae
Articles created by Qbugbot
Bibionomorpha genera